Now Generation (stylized as G3R4Ç4O BR4S1L) is a Brazilian telenovela produced and broadcast by TV Globo. It was created by Filipe Miguez and Izabel de Oliveira. The series discussed topics and issues surrounding technology usage, such as open-source software, drones, and programming as part of an education system.

The series starred Murilo Benício, Cláudia Abreu, Chandelly Braz, Humberto Carrão, Taís Araújo, Isabelle Drummond, Ricardo Tozzi, Luís Miranda, Lázaro Ramos, and Renata Sorrah. Geração Brasil's. The writers were advised by academics and consultants, such as Ronaldo Lemos and Hermano Vianna.

Plot 
Jonas Marra (Murilo Benício) is a Brazilian computer engineer and entrepreneur who lives in Silicon Valley, California. He left Brazil at a very young age in search of financing for his invention called The Brow, which is a low-cost computer that eventually revolutionized the global computer industry during the 1980s.

Once in the United States, Jonas created the Marra Corporation. Along with Marra's professional success, he married Pamela Parker (Claudia Abreu), who was an America's sweetheart and heir to the largest TV channel in the country.

For 20 years, Marra ran his company and lived happily with his family. The couple raised a daughter, Megan (Isabelle Drummond). Megan was the biological daughter of Pamela and her past boyfriend, a French playboy killed in a car accident before Megan was born. She was, however, more of a wild, rebellious girl and her controversial escapades are daily fixtures of the gossip newspapers. Marra and his wife had to work hard keeping Megan out of trouble.

Through the years Marra became an icon, and his position and decisions within the tech industry had never been questioned. However, one day, Marra Corporation's shareholders decided that the company needed new talents to allow themselves to cope and compete in a rapidly changing tech industry. For this purpose, they requested that Marra would retire.

After this announcement, Jonas, drawing from his vast 42 years of experience, transferred the Marra Corporation headquarters to Brazil. The decision became headline news from around the world. In a move that further shocked the world, Marra revealed that he would search for a computer engineering genius in his home country to become his successor.

Meanwhile, in Rio de Janeiro, the young Davi (Humberto Carrão) was working hard to gain traction for his project. Like Jonas, he was also of humble origins and believed that access to information should be democratized. Thus, he created Junior, a tool that taught computer programming. All the inspiration for the invention came from Plugar, an NGO dedicated to the digital inclusion of disadvantaged children, located in Gambiarra, a fictitious district of Rio's West Zone. Through Plugar, Davi had his first contact with a computer, where he began teaching himself computer engineering. Davi also wanted to create better opportunities for children to learn about technology, so he developed the ABC of computer programming with Herval, founder of Plugar.

In Recife, in search of so-called "angels", Davi packed a bag with Junior looking for a chance to show it off to investors. Upon arrival at Recife Digital Davi knows Manu (Chandelly Braz), beautiful recifense, and very much skilled in computer and games. It is in the world of games that the two will be closer than they might think. Behind their avatars and nicknames, they will be impressed with the opponent's skills, not realizing who is on the other side of the screen. The two will be very close when they are selected to participate in the Marra Brazil contest. With over 12 young people, Davi and Manu will go through several technological challenges, having to prove their capabilities to Jonas. In the final bout, Manu and Davi had to face each other in creating a killer app. Breaking rules and by now in love, the two have a single project, putting Jonas against the wall: either hire the two, or hire neither.

Angry with the handling and amazed at the ability of the duo, Jonas proposes an extra challenge: their app will have to blow up within the short deadline until the final stage of the competition.

Cast

Guest stars

References

External links 
  
 

2014 telenovelas
Brazilian telenovelas
2014 Brazilian television series debuts
2014 Brazilian television series endings
Computing in fiction
TV Globo telenovelas
Television shows set in California
Television shows set in Recife
Television shows set in Rio de Janeiro (city)
Television series about computing
Works about computer hacking
Portuguese-language telenovelas